"Bom Bom" is a song by the British-Dutch three-piece music group Sam and the Womp. The track was first released in the United Kingdom on 19 August 2012. The song debuted at number one on the UK Singles Chart with 107,461 copies sold in its first week.

"Bom Bom" was co-produced by Sam Ritchie, Aaron Horn and Raz Olsher at Fossil Studios in Hackney, London. The song is in the key of F minor.

Music video
A music video to accompany the release of "Bom Bom" was first released onto YouTube on 3 August 2012 at a total length of two minutes and 55 seconds.

Reception

Critical reception
Lewis Corner of Digital Spy gave the song a positive review, stating:

Lady Oo sing-speaks over an earworm hook of electronic reverb and bouncy brass that's as bonkers as it is addictive. While parts of the track may sound like Basil Brush attempting his best Björk impression at the staff BBQ, it results in a bizarrely catchy tune that we'll all pretend isn't on our iPods for years to come.

Chart performance
In the chart week dated 1 September 2012, "Bom Bom" debuted at number-one on the UK Singles Chart with 107,461 copies sold. For that same charting week, the track also debuted at number-one on the UK Dance Chart. The song sold 372,000 copies by the end of 2012 making it the 42nd best-selling single of the year.

Usage in media
In the United States, the song was used in the CBS television series Elementary where it was used in an opening scene from the episode "The Deductionist" in 2013. It also appears two times in the 2013 animated film Escape from Planet Earth. In addition, it is in the official soundtrack of the 2012 Xbox 360 game Forza Horizon, and was used in promotional material for the MTV series Geordie Shore. In 2013, it featured in TV commercials for Kmart Australia. In Canada, the song has been used in a series of TV commercials for the Joe Fresh line of clothing. In the United Kingdom, it is heard in TV commercials for online casino company 32Red. It is also featured in The Sims 3: Island Paradise and is sung in Simlish. It is also featured in the first trailer of Free Birds. It can also be heard in the Razzie-winning/ALFS Award-nominated mystery buddy comedy film Holmes & Watson.

Track listing

Charts

Weekly charts

Year-end charts

Certifications

References

2012 debut singles
2012 songs
Number-one singles in Scotland
UK Singles Chart number-one singles
Stiff Records singles